, the toad lily or hairy toad lily, is a Japanese species of hardy herbaceous perennial plant in the lily family Liliaceae.

It is found growing on shaded rocky cliffs and stream banks in central and southern Japan. Leaves are large and wide, clasping around the stem. The flowers are whitish to pale purple with dark purple spots.

Varieties
 Tricyrtis hirta var. hirta - central and southern Japan
 Tricyrtis hirta var. masamunei (Makino) Masam - Kyushu

References

hirta
Plants described in 1784
Flora of Japan